Draconibacterium filum is a Gram-negative, long-rod-shaped and facultatively anaerobic bacterium from the genus of Draconibacterium which has been isolated from sediments from the coast of Korea.

References

Bacteroidia
Bacteria described in 2015